The Christian Church (Disciples of Christ) in Canada is a Reformed Restorationist denomination. It is affiliated with the Disciples Ecumenical Consultative Council and the World Communion of Reformed Churches. The headquarters is in Guelph.

History
The Christian Church (Disciples of Christ) in Canada has its origins in a church founded in 1811 in Charlottetown by a Scottish immigrant.  It was officially founded in 1922.  It became a region of the Christian Church (Disciples of Christ) in USA in 1968.  According to a denomination census released in 2020, it claimed 21 member churches.

Beliefs 
The denomination practices 'believers baptism' meaning that infants are not generally baptized. 

Like other mainline denominations, the Disciples of Christ in Canada permits each congregation to decide whether to marry same-gender couples.

References

External links
 Official Website

Christian Church (Disciples of Christ)
Restoration Movement denominations 
Reformed denominations in Canada